Eastern Obolo (or Obolo agan̄ Mbum-ura in the native Obolo language) is a Local Government Area (LGA) in southern Nigeria, with it's headquarters at Okoroete. It is a coastal local government area in Akwa-Ibom State under great tidal influence from the Bight of Bonny. Eastern Obolo LGA was mapped out of Ikot Abasi LGA by the Federal Government of Nigeria on 4 December 1996 with over 30,000 residents across a total area of approximately 17,000 km². It comprises 16 villages, divided into two clans, namely Okoroete and Iko. It has ten political wards. All the villages in Eastern Obolo are of the Obolo ethnic group , there exist a common ancestral lineage which allows for peaceful coexistence and inter-relationship amongst them.

Location 

Eastern Obolo is located in the Niger Delta fringe between Imo and Qua Iboe Rivers estuaries and lies between latitudes 4° 28' and 4° 53' and longitudes 7° 50' and 7° 55' East. It is bounded to the north by Mkpat Enin Local Government Area, northeast by Onna, west by Ikot Abasi, southeast by Ibeno Local Government Area and in the south by the Atlantic Ocean.

Culture 

The cultural heritage is not restricted to the people; rather, to the entire Niger Delta with unique traditional dressing synonymous with "Etibo" and "Wurkor".

Natural resources 

Eastern Obolo has abundant mineral deposits with onshore and offshore oil wells at Elek-Okpoon̄, Iko, Otunene, Emeroke, Ikonta and Obianga. There is a fishing settlements at Educwink, Elek-Okpoon̄, Agan-asa. Forest reserves include mangrove, iroko, raffia, rubber, kolanut, coconut, peas, and mango.

Commerce 

Eastern Obolo tradespeople are predominantly fishermen, with over 65 per cent involved in active fishing.

People 

The people are a combination of Obolo ethnic group and Iko extractions; strong cultural affinity exists among the people. It has a total landmass of 117,008 square kilometers with an estimated shoreline about 184 km long. Obolo language is the major language of the people as the different communities speak different dialects of Obolo, which are mutually intelligible. The Iko dialect spoken in Iko clan and is intelligible to a large number of people in Eastern Obolo. Iko dialect is closely related to Obolo and to the Okoroutip dialect spoken in Ibeno LGA, the sister/twin LGA of Eastern Obolo.

Population 
The community population is predominantly the Obolos(75%), Ibibio and Ibo make up the remaining population. Emigration activities in the community is as a result of low productivity due to poor fish catch, limited farmlands, and the high rate of unemployment.

http://www.helloakwaibom.com/eastern-obolo-lga/  Hello Akwa-Ibom

Local Government Areas in Akwa Ibom State
Populated coastal places in Nigeria